Mira Katherine Sorvino (born September 28, 1967) is an American actress. She won the Academy Award and Golden Globe for Best Supporting Actress for her performance in Woody Allen's Mighty Aphrodite (1995).

She also starred in the films Romy and Michele's High School Reunion (1997), Mimic (1997), Lulu on the Bridge (1998), The Replacement Killers (1998), Summer of Sam (1999), and Like Dandelion Dust (2009). For her work in television, she was nominated for a Primetime Emmy Award for Outstanding Lead Actress in a Limited Series or Movie for her portrayal of Marilyn Monroe in Norma Jean & Marilyn (1996), and twice nominated for a Golden Globe for Best Actress – Miniseries or Television Film, again for her performance as Marilyn Monroe and her leading role in Human Trafficking (2005).

Early life 
Sorvino was born on September 28, 1967 in Manhattan, New York City, to Lorraine Ruth Davis, a drama therapist for Alzheimer's disease patients and former actress; and Paul Sorvino, an actor and film director. She has two siblings, Michael Sorvino and Amanda. She is of Italian descent on her father's side.

She was raised in Tenafly, New Jersey, where she wrote and acted in backyard plays with her childhood friend Hope Davis, and in theater productions at Dwight-Englewood School. As a child, she was strongly influenced to pursue social causes by her mother, who participated in the March on Washington. Sorvino excelled in high school and was accepted into Harvard University. She studied for one year as an exchange student with CIEE in Beijing, China, where she studied Mandarin Chinese. In 1989, she graduated from Harvard magna cum laude with a degree in East Asian studies. She also helped found the Harvard-Radcliffe Veritones, one of Harvard's co-ed a cappella groups, in 1985.

Career 
Sorvino's first major screen appearance was in the teen television series Swans Crossing, where she appeared in six episodes. When the 1993 film Amongst Friends entered preproduction, she was hired as third assistant director, then promoted to casting director, then to assistant producer, and finally offered a lead role. The positive reviews she received led to more acting opportunities.

After small roles in Robert Redford's Quiz Show and Whit Stillman's Barcelona, she was cast in Woody Allen's Mighty Aphrodite (1995). Her portrayal of a happy-go-lucky prostitute made her a star, winning her an Academy Award and Golden Globe for Best Supporting Actress. Although the film brought her international recognition, she described its shooting as extremely stressful: "I was absolutely neurotic doing Mighty Aphrodite," she recalled. "Every night brought a new nervous breakdown. I'd cry and talk to God, I was so nervous. Then the next day, I'd show up and do my scenes."

Her other credits include Romy and Michele's High School Reunion with Lisa Kudrow, At First Sight with Val Kilmer, and Spike Lee's Summer of Sam. She portrayed Marilyn Monroe for the 1996 HBO film Norma Jean & Marilyn, for which she was nominated for a Golden Globe; and had the lead role in Guillermo del Toro's horror film Mimic. In 1995, she portrayed Conchita Closson in the BBC miniseries The Buccaneers, based on Edith Wharton's last novel. She starred as Daisy Buchanan in the 2000 television film The Great Gatsby.

In 2002, Sorvino appeared as the lead in The Triumph of Love, an adaptation of the 1732 Marivaux play. That year she also starred in WiseGirls alongside Mariah Carey and Melora Walters. In 2006, she received a Golden Globe nomination for her role as an Immigration and Customs Enforcement agent in the Lifetime film Human Trafficking. She had a supporting role in the drama Reservation Road (2007) with Mark Ruffalo.

In February 2008, she guest-starred as psychiatrist Cate Milton in the "Frozen" episode of the medical television drama House. Plans to make hers a recurring character were interrupted by the writers' strike.

She starred in Attack on Leningrad (2009), Multiple Sarcasms (2010) with Timothy Hutton and Stockard Channing, and Nancy Savoca's Union Square (2012), with Patti Lupone and Tammy Blanchard. The film premiered at the Toronto International Film Festival to good reviews. In the same year, Sorvino played the mother of the lead in the film adaptation of Wendy Mass's popular children's book Jeremy Fink and the Meaning of Life.

In 2014, she reappeared as Head Detective Betsy Brannigan on the final season of Psych, and on the fourth season of Falling Skies as John Pope's love interest, Sara. Sorvino also joined the cast of the television series Intruders, playing the role of Amy Whelan. In 2016, she appeared in the Netflix series Lady Dynamite as an actor working on a sitcom pilot named White Trash. In 2018, Sorvino played the role of Amy in the psychological thriller Look Away, alongside Jason Isaacs and India Eisley.

In 2019, Sorvino was cast in the Netflix miniseries Hollywood as an actor whose career stalled out after a relationship with a studio head.

Personal life 
Between 1996 and 1998, Mira Sorvino was romantically involved with director Quentin Tarantino, who was her escort to the Academy Awards ceremony where she won Best Supporting Actress for Mighty Aphrodite.

Sorvino met actor Christopher Backus at a friend's charades party in August 2003. On June 11, 2004, they married in a private civil ceremony at the Santa Barbara, California courthouse, then later had a hilltop ceremony in Capri, Italy. They have four children: two daughters and two sons. 

In honor of Sorvino's role as Susan Tyler, an entomologist who investigated deadly insect mutations in the film Mimic, the discovery of a compound excreted as a defense mechanism by the sunburst diving beetle was named mirasorvone by entomologist Thomas Eisner.

In September 2014, Sorvino gave a wide-ranging interview on The Nerdist Podcast, where she discussed her education, living in China, and her varied interests. She is a Christian and resides with her family in Los Angeles, California.

In 2017, Sorvino came out publicly about the sexual harassment she endured from producer Harvey Weinstein and believes her career was damaged after she rebuffed Weinstein's advances. According to Peter Jackson, Weinstein blocked Sorvino and Ashley Judd, another of his alleged victims, from being considered for parts in The Lord of the Rings films. In 2019 she also made public that she was a date rape victim.

Political activism
Sorvino has been affiliated with Amnesty International since 2004. In 2006 she was honored with their Artist of Conscience Award, given to those who have made longstanding philanthropic and humanist efforts. From 2009 to 2012 she was a United Nations Goodwill ambassador for combatting human trafficking, and has lobbied Congress to abolish the practice in Darfur.

Filmography

Film

Television

Awards and nominations

Works and publications

References

External links 

 
 Mira Sorvino at the American Film Institute 
 
 

1967 births
Living people
20th-century American actresses
21st-century American actresses
Actresses from New Jersey
Actresses from Los Angeles
Actresses from New York City
American Christians
American film actresses
American people of Italian descent
American television actresses
Best Supporting Actress Academy Award winners
Best Supporting Actress Golden Globe (film) winners
Dwight-Englewood School alumni
Harvard University alumni
People from Manhattan
People from Tenafly, New Jersey